Caroline Sascha Cogez is a Danish-French director/writer whose short films include fiction, documentary, commercials and music promos. Cogez is educated from the Danish independent film school super16 and she has studied sociology at Roskilde University.

Cogez film She Sings (2011) received the Jury's Special Award at Cinema Varite in Iran. Her movie Lulu (2014) won the 2015 Robert Awards in Denmark.

Filmography

Writer and director 
Cogez has both written and directed most of her films, short films and documentaries.

Other works and appearances 
Cogez has worked on and appeared in several other films, notably Dancer in the Dark (2000) and Dogville (2003), in which she was an assistant director.

Glasgow Short Film Festival made a retrospective on Cogez in 2013.

References 
 Lulu Danish Film Institute

Sources and external links 
 
 Caroline Sascha Cogez at U Itch I Scratch
 Caroline Sascha Cogez on Vimeo
 Super16 homepage

French directors
French women writers
Living people
Year of birth missing (living people)